Coryanthes leucocorys is a species of orchid found in Colombia, Ecuador and Peru.

References

External links

leucocorys
Orchids of Colombia
Orchids of Ecuador
Orchids of Peru